Borki  is the part of Dziecinów village, Gmina Sobienie-Jeziory. From 1975 to 1998 this place was in Siedlce Voivodeship.

Villages in Otwock County